Zijerd (also Romanized as Zījerd; also known as Zakherd and Zegerd) is a village in Kavar Rural District, in the Central District of Kavar County, Fars Province, Iran. At the 2006 census, its population was 389, in 82 families.

References 

Populated places in Kavar County